The 1998 UCLA vs. Miami football game, played December 5, 1998, was an NCAA college football game held between the UCLA Bruins and the Miami Hurricanes at the Orange Bowl, the home stadium of Miami. The game had large implications as UCLA was assured a spot in the Fiesta Bowl with a victory; that season, the Fiesta Bowl served as the site for the BCS National Championship. After trailing 38–21 late into the third quarter, Miami stormed back to stun the Bruins 49–45.

The game remains infamous among UCLA fans, as the Bruins' loss denied them their best shot to date at their first national championship since 1954.

The Bruins were coached by Bob Toledo. They came into the game with a 10–0 record and riding a 20-game winning streak dating back to the previous season, having already clinched the Pac-10 championship with an 8–0 record in conference play. The Hurricanes, coached by Butch Davis, went into the game with a 7–3 record including a 5–2 mark in Big East play.

Leading up to the game
The Bruins were undefeated heading into the game, only needing a win to secure a spot in the National Championship game.

Miami was just coming off a blowout loss the previous week to the Syracuse Orangemen, 66–13.  The loss denied them their first ever Big East conference championship.

The game had previously been scheduled for September 26; however, the threat of Hurricane Georges prompted administrators from both schools to postpone the game.

A players’ plan by the Bruins to wear black wristbands against the Hurricanes to protest falling minority enrollment at UC-system schools was the subject of a series of emotional team meetings the week leading up to the game. The wristband issue dominated the team's normal pre-game Friday night meeting. Reflecting on the saga, OT Kris Farris stated, “This team had tremendous focus right before games, and when the topic was switched to something that wasn’t about the game, I just felt ‘Wow, this team is not focused.’ Even that that thought entered my mind told me ‘Oh, wow, I’m not sure how focused we are.'” QB Cade McNown also recalled having concerns, stating, “It was disappointing to be thinking about anything other than beating Miami. There’s a time and place to make statements that are political or social. A few guys saw that as the time and place.”

Game summary
Miami led 21-17 going into halftime. UCLA took over in the 3rd quarter, scoring 3 straight touchdowns to take a 38–21 advantage late in the 3rd quarter. After a late rally by Miami to tighten the score to 45–42, UCLA began driving with hopes of running out the clock, leading to the most pivotal play of the game.

With 3:34 remaining in the fourth quarter, UCLA had a 3rd and 8 at their own 44-yard line, UCLA quarterback Cade McNown completed a pass over the middle to WR Brad Melsby, who was eventually tackled at Miami's 26-yard line. As he was tackled, he fumbled the ball and Miami recovered. Replays showed that Melsby was down before the ball came loose, but as instant replay didn't exist in college football back then, nothing could be done to reverse the ruling. Miami made the most of their opportunity, driving for a touchdown to take the lead 49–45 with 50 seconds remaining. Miami's defense would hold UCLA on its ensuing drive, securing the victory. Edgerrin James rushed for a Miami and Big East record 299 yards.

Aftermath and impact
As UCLA exited the field, Miami fans taunted them with “Rose Bowl! Rose Bowl!” chants. UCLA still earned a trip to the Rose Bowl; however, given that it was the first year of the BCS and the Rose Bowl wasn't that year's designated national championship game, it was seen as a disappointment. They would go on to lose the Rose Bowl to Wisconsin 38–31; they haven't played in the Rose Bowl (or any other major bowl) since.

Also hurt by the game were the Arizona Wildcats. Expecting a UCLA victory, the Wildcats were anticipating their first trip to the Rose Bowl in program history; instead, they played in the Holiday Bowl, where they defeated Nebraska 23–20.

The biggest beneficiary was Florida State, one of Miami's fiercest rivals. The upset, along with Texas A&M upsetting #3 Kansas State later that day, propelled Florida State into the #2 ranking in the BCS, earning them a spot in the Fiesta Bowl against Tennessee. They would lose 23–16.

Some Miami fans have viewed the 1998 triumph over UCLA as a key moment that kickstarted Miami's rise back to the top tier of the college football landscape, which culminated in a dominant 2001 campaign.

References

vs. Miami 1998
vs. UCLA 1998
December 1998 sports events in the United States
1998 in sports in Florida
1998 Pacific-10 Conference football season
1998 Big East Conference football season